Antitrust (also titled Conspiracy.com and Startup) is a 2001 American techno thriller film written by Howard Franklin and directed by Peter Howitt.

Antitrust portrays young idealistic programmers and a large corporation (NURV) that offers a significant salary, an informal working environment, and creative opportunities for those talented individuals willing to work for them. The charismatic CEO of NURV (Tim Robbins) seems to be good-natured, but new employee and protagonist Milo Hoffman (Ryan Phillippe) begins to unravel the terrible hidden truth of NURV's operation.

The film stars Phillippe, Rachael Leigh Cook, Claire Forlani, and Robbins. Antitrust opened in the United States on January 12, 2001, and was generally panned by critics.

Plot
Working with his three friends at their new software development company Skullbocks, Stanford graduate Milo Hoffman is recruited by Gary Winston, the CEO of the software corporation NURV.  Milo is offered an attractive programming position with a large paycheck, an almost-unrestrained working environment, and extensive creative control over his work.  After accepting, Hoffman and his girlfriend, Alice Poulson (Forlani), move to NURV headquarters in Portland, Oregon.

Despite development of the flagship product (Synapse, a worldwide media distribution network) being well on schedule, Hoffman soon becomes suspicious of the excellent source code that Winston personally provides to him, seemingly when needed most, while refusing to divulge the code's origin.

After his best friend and fellow computer programmer, Teddy Chin, is murdered, Hoffman discovers that NURV is stealing the code they need from programmers around the world—including Chin—and then killing them.  NURV not only employs an extensive surveillance system to observe and steal code, the company has infiltrated the Justice Department and most mainstream media.  Even Hoffman's girlfriend is a plant, an ex-con hired by the company to spy on and manipulate him.

In a secret NURV database of employee surveillance dossiers, Hoffman discovers highly-sensitive personal information about Lisa Calighan (Cook), a friendly co-worker.  When he says he knows the company has this information about her, she agrees to help him expose NURV's crimes.  Coordinating with Brian Bissel, Hoffman's old start-up friend, they plan to use a local public-access television station to hijack Synapse and globally broadcast their charges against NURV.  However, Calighan is actually Winston's accomplice and foils Hoffman.

When the plan fails, and as Winston prepares to kill Hoffman, a backup plan is put into motion.  Off-screen, Hoffman had previously confronted and convinced Poulson to turn against NURV; she, the fourth member of Skullbocks, and NURV's incorruptible security contractors usurp one of NURV's own work centers—"Building 21"—and transmit incriminating evidence with the Synapse code.  Calighan, Winston, and his entourage are arrested by the FBI for their crimes.  After amicably parting ways with the redeemed Poulson, Hoffman rejoins Skullbocks.

Cast
 Ryan Phillippe as Milo Hoffman
 Rachael Leigh Cook as Lisa Calighan
 Claire Forlani as Alice Poulson/Rebecca Paul
 Tim Robbins as Gary Winston
 Douglas McFerran as Bob Shrot
 Richard Roundtree as Lyle Barton
 Tygh Runyan as Larry Banks
 Yee Jee Tso as Teddy Chin
 Nate Dushku as Brian Bissel
 Ned Bellamy as Phil Grimes
 Tyler Labine as Redmond Schmeichel
 Scott Bellis as Randy Sheringham
 David Lovgren as Danny Solskjær
 Zahf Hajee as Desi
 Jonathon Young as Stinky
 Rick Worthy as Shrot's Assistant
 Peter Howitt as Homeless man
 Gregor Trpin as Computer Guy

Allusions

Roger Ebert found Gary Winston to be a thinly disguised pastiche of entrepreneur Bill Gates; so much so that he was "surprised [the writers] didn't protect against libel by having the villain wear a name tag saying, 'Hi! I'm not Bill! Similarly, Ebert felt NURV "seems a whole lot like Microsoft". Parallels between the fictional and real-world software giants were also drawn by Lisa Bowman of ZDNet UK, James Berardinelli of ReelViews, and Rita Kempley of The Washington Post.

Production
Principal photography for Antitrust took place in Vancouver, British Columbia, California, and Portland, Oregon.

Stanley Park in Vancouver served as the grounds for Gary Winston's house, although the gate house at its entrance was faux. The exterior of Winston's house itself was wholly computer-generated; only the paved walkway and body of water in the background are physically present in the park.  For later shots of Winston and Hoffman walking along a beach near the house, the CG house was placed in the background of Bowen Island, the shooting location.  Catherine Hardwicke designed the interior sets for Winston's house, which featured several different units, or "pods", e.g., personal, work, and recreation units. No scenes take place in any of the personal areas, however; only public areas made it to the screen. While the digital paintings in Winston's home were created with  green screen technology, the concept was based on technology that was already available in the real world. The characters even refer to Bill Gates' house which, in real life, had such art.  The paintings which appeared for Hoffman were of a cartoon character, "Alien Kitty", developed by Floyd Hughes specifically for the film.

Simon Fraser University's Burnaby campus stood in for external shots of NURV headquarters.

The Chan Centre for the Performing Arts at the University of British Columbia (UBC) was used for several internal locations.  The centre's foyer area became the NURV canteen; the set decoration for which was inspired by Apple's canteen, which the producers saw during a visit to their corporate headquarters.  The inside of the Chan—used for concerts—served as the shape for "The Egg", or "The NURV Center", where Hoffman's cubicle is located.  Described as "a big surfboard freak" by director Peter Howitt, production designer Catherine Hardwicke surrounded "The Egg" set  with surfboards mounted to the walls; Howitt has said, "The idea was to make NURV a very cool looking place."  Both sets for NURV's Building 21 were also on UBC's campus.  The internal set was an art gallery on campus, while the exterior was built for the film on the university's grounds.  According to Howitt, UBC students kept attempting to steal the Building 21 set pieces.

Hoffman and Poulson's new home—a real house in Vancouver—was a "very tight" shooting location and a very rigorous first week for shooting because, as opposed to a set, the crew could not move the walls.  The painting in the living room is the product of a young Vancouver artist, and was purchased by Howitt as his first piece of art.

The new Skullbocks office was a real loft, also in Vancouver, on Beatty Street.

Open source
Antitrusts pro–open source story excited industry leaders and professionals, with the prospects of expanding the public's awareness and knowledge level of the availability of open-source software.  The film heavily features Linux and its community, using screenshots of the Gnome desktop, consulting Linux professionals, and including cameos by Miguel de Icaza and Scott McNealy (the latter appearing in the film's trailers). Jon Hall, executive director of Linux International and consultant on the film, said "[Antitrust] is a way of bringing the concept of open source and the fact that there is an alternative to the general public, who often don't even know that there is one."

Despite the film's message about open source computing, MGM did not follow through with their marketing: the official website for Antitrust featured some videotaped interviews which were only available in Apple's proprietary QuickTime format.

Reception
Antitrust received mainly negative reviews, and has a "Rotten" consensus of 24% on Rotten Tomatoes, based on 106 reviews, with an average score of 4 out of 10. The summary states "Due to its use of clichéd and ludicrous plot devices, this thriller is more predictable than suspenseful. Also, the acting is bad." The film also has a score of 31 out 100, based on 29 reviews, on Metacritic. Audiences polled by CinemaScore gave the film a grade "B+" on scale of A to F.

Roger Ebert of the Chicago Sun-Times gave the film two stars out of four. Linux.com appreciated the film's open-source message, but felt the film overall was lackluster, saying AntiTrust is probably worth a $7.50 ticket on a night when you've got nothing else planned."

James Keith La Croix of Detroit's Metro Times gave the film four stars, impressed that "Antitrust is a thriller that actually thrills."

The film won both the Golden Goblet for Best Feature Film, and Best Director for Howitt, at the 2001 Shanghai International Film Festival.

Home media
Antitrust was released as a "Special Edition" DVD on May 15, 2001, and on VHS on December 26, 2001. The DVD features audio commentary by the director and editor, an exclusive documentary, deleted scenes and alternative opening and closing sequences with director's commentary, Everclear's music video for "When It All Goes Wrong Again" (which is played over the beginning of the closing credits), and the original theatrical trailer.  The DVD was re-released August 1, 2006.  It was released on Blu-ray Disc on September 22, 2015.

See also
 List of films featuring surveillance

References

External links

 
 

2001 films
2001 thriller films
2000s American films
2000s English-language films
American thriller films
Films about computer and internet entrepreneurs
Films about security and surveillance
Films directed by Peter Howitt
Films scored by Don Davis (composer)
Films set in Portland, Oregon
Films shot in California 
Films shot in Portland, Oregon 
Films shot in Vancouver 
Films with screenplays by Howard Franklin
Hyde Park Entertainment films
Metro-Goldwyn-Mayer films
Techno-thriller films
Works about free software